Events from the year 1777 in Canada.

Incumbents
Monarch: George III

Governors
Governor of the Province of Quebec: Guy Carleton
Governor of Nova Scotia: Lord William Campbell
Commodore-Governor of Newfoundland: John Byron
Governor of St. John's Island: Walter Patterson

Events
July 4 – Near Fort Ticonderoga, General Burgoyne offers condonement if colonists lay down their arms.
September 19 – General Burgoyne's Indian and French allies desert at the battle of Stillwater.
October 16 – Articles of Capitulation of 5,782 British, under Burgoyne are written.
October 17 – Though aware of approaching relief, Burgoyne, having promised to capitulate, and fearing annihilation by a threatened attack, signs the capitulation. During its first session the Canadian Council passes sixteen ordinances, adopts English Commercial law, and constitutes itself a Court of Appeal, with final resort to the Privy Council in England.

Full date unknown
In the House of Lords, Lord Camden declares: "If I were an American, I should resist to the last such manifest exertions of tyranny, violence and injustice."
David Thompson enters Grey Coat School

Births
June 20 – Jean-Jacques Lartigue, bishop of Montreal (d.1840)

Deaths

Historical documents

American Revolutionary War

Detailed strategy for British invasion via Lake Champlain includes comment that it's "a mistaken Idea of Humanity" not to employ Indigenous fighters

Garrisons, military stores, cantonments: Gen. Burgoyne on how invasion of eastern New York should be arranged in Canada (Note: "savages" used)

United States willing to conquer Britain's possessions jointly with France, giving U.S. Canada and Atlantic colonies plus half of Newfoundland fishery

"Aukwark (sic), ignorant, disinclined to the service, and spiritless" - On arrival, Burgoyne finds some Canadian troops not ready for duty

Burgoyne's orders to invasion army warn that enemy "is well fitted by disposition and practice for the stratagems and enterprizes of little war"

Burgoyne tells Indigenous allies on Boquet River that they must not shed blood after battle or harm prisoners or civilians or scalp any but corpses

Estimating size of Burgoyne's army, Alexander Hamilton assumes troops guarding Canada are not Canadians, "many of whom are notoriously disaffected"

Oneidas and "Caghnawagas from Canada" tell Gen. Schuyler that "Missesaques, Hurons & Chippeways" are with John Johnson (Note: "savages" used)

Failed Fort Stanwix siege and Oriskany battle report mentions allied "chiefs Joseph and Bull," Indigenous impetuousness, and Mississaugas' "slackness"

Burgoyne blames his failure in part on "the total defection of the Indians [and] the desertion or timidity of the Canadians and Provincials"

Canada

Gov. Carleton reports "turbulent Faction" is behind independence movement, but "Noblesse, Clergy, and [much] of the Bourgeoisie" help restore order

All men 16 to 60 must serve in Quebec militia and can be penalized for refusal, absence, or disobedience; some over 60 must supply carts and sleighs

"For the speedy administration of justice" - Quebec governor and council set up civil and criminal courts

Quebec ordinance prohibits selling rum and other strong liquor to Indigenous people, buying their clothes and arms, and unlicenced trading with them

Proclamation prohibits export of livestock, grain, flour or "bisquit[...]until it can be exactly ascertained whether [it] may be with safety permitted"

Quebec City regulations require owners to clean street in front of their buildings weekly, and prohibit on-street slaughtering and other nuisances

In Quebec City, "a Piece of Rock fell from the Ramparts over Sault-au-matelot Street, forced its Way through a Stable and killed two Horses therein"

Alexander Simpson of lower town Quebec City seeks return of "A Panese woman named Mary Ann" and offers 40 shilling reward

"M. Crofton has taken a House[...]where she proposes keeping a School for young Ladies, little Girls, and such little Boys as wear petticoats"

£4 reward offered for "a Negro man called Bruce[...]since absconded" and suspected of break and enter and theft of "a great quantity of Liquors" etc.

Gazette printer William Brown offers $4 reward for capture of "A Negro Lad named Joe, born in Africa, about twenty years of age"

Call for contractors to supply firewood to these garrisons: Quebec City (4,000 cords annually), Montreal (2,000), Trois-Rivières (1,000), Chambly (600)

Nova Scotia

Benjamin Marston arrives in Halifax after months of detention in Boston, happy to see his Eliza and hoping "to be able to provide for that dearest Girl"

Nova Scotia JPs to set "Artificers and Labourers" wages, "taking into Consideration the Circumstances of the Times and Prices of Provisions"

Concealing "any Stranger or idle wandering Person" can bring fine of £10-20 or 2-4 months in jail, and £40/1 year in jail for advising desertion

Backed by light infantry, Nova Scotia Council member convinces all along Saint John River (including Indigenous people) to take loyalty oath

In engagement west of Cape Sable, HMS Flora (its crew of "brave British Tars" out-numbered 4 to 1) retakes Royal Navy man of war from two privateers

Newfoundland

Despite Royal Navy protection of Newfoundland trade, London believes Boston's "fleet of privateers" wants to take many ships and destroy rest

Colonies should not have access to Newfoundland and Labrador fisheries, which employ artificers, shippers and poor people of Britain and Ireland

Labrador

After Royal Navy convoy commander improperly presses one of his crew and fails to shepherd ships, George Cartwright sails alone in privateer zone

"Young fool of a deer caught at last" - When Cartwright's "poor Indian boy Jack" steps on deer trap, Cartwright is fortunately there to release him

Etc.

Map: Nova Scotia, Newfoundland, Labrador south coast and Gulf of St. Lawrence islands (with numerous rivers and fishing banks)

References 

 
Canada
77